Andrew Preston Varley (December 2, 1934 – November 19, 2018) was an American politician in the state of Iowa.

Varley was born in Stuart, Iowa. He attended Iowa State University and North Carolina State University and was a farmer. He served in the Iowa House of Representatives from 1967 to 1979 as a Republican.

He died on November 19, 2018, in Stuart, Iowa at age 83.

References

1934 births
2018 deaths
People from Stuart, Iowa
Iowa State University alumni
North Carolina State University alumni
Farmers from Iowa
Republican Party members of the Iowa House of Representatives